The article uses the latest official Romanization of Ukrainian on resolution of the Government of Ukraine.

This is a list of individuals who have been presented with the title Hero of Ukraine in reverse chronological order.

, the total number of awards is 692. Some decrees on the assignment of the title Hero of Ukraine were not published.

Out of all recipients, 421 (%) have a distinction of the "Order of the Gold Star" and 271 (%) have a distinction of the "Order of the State". Number of awards that were given posthumously is 296 (%). By gender, 652 (%) of the recipients are men.

The youngest recipient is a Ukrainian Paralympian athlete Viktor Smyrnov who was 18 years and 78 days old. The oldest recipient – Maksym Hulyi received the award on his 100th birthday.

The only non-citizen awarded the award and for whom specifically an exclusion was made at parliamentary level was Belarusian Mikhail Zhyzneuski in June 2017 (Zhyzneuski was awarded posthumously). There are however 17 other individuals who were awarded the Hero of Ukraine and who were never citizens of Ukraine as they died before Ukraine obtained its independence. Among them are Avgustyn Voloshyn, Stepan Bandera (annulled), Volodymyr Ivasyuk, Vasyl Stus, liquidators Mykola Vashchuk, Vasyl Ihnatenko, Oleksandr Lelechko, Mykola Tytenok, Volodymyr Tishura.

There are 17 heroes of Ukraine who previously were awarded the Hero of Socialist Labour.

2022 

: 196.

2021 
Total number of awards: 17.

2020 
Total number of awards: 22.

2019 
Total number of awards: 14.

2018 
Total number of awards: 4.

2017 
Total number of awards: 10.

2016 
Total number of awards: 12.

2015 
Total number of awards: 21.

2014 
Total number of awards: 110.

2013 
Total number of awards: 11.

2012 
Total number of awards: 10.

2011 
Total number of awards: 11.

2010 
Total number of awards: 11. Some of the awards have come into question. See Hero of Ukraine: Controversial awards for more details.

2009
Total number of awards: 27.

2008
Total number of awards: 18.

2007
Total number of awards: 25. Some of the awards have come into question. See Hero of Ukraine: Controversial awards for more details.

2006
Total number of awards: 25.

2005
Total number of awards: 17.

2004
Total number of awards: 41. Some of the awards have come into question. See Hero of Ukraine: Controversial awards for more details.

2003
Total number of awards: 16.

2002
Total number of awards: 25.

2001
Total number of awards: 20.

2000
Total number of awards: 9.

1999
Total number of awards: 19.

1998
Total number of awards: 1.

References

External links
Ukrainian National Award – "Hero of Ukraine" at the official website of the President of Ukraine. in Ukrainian, in Russian
Ribbon bars for various state decorations page on the official site of the Ukrainian President  

 
Heroes of Ukraine
Heroes